George Henry Raveling (born June 27, 1937) is an American former college basketball player and coach. He played at Villanova University, and was the head coach at Washington State University  the University of Iowa  and the University of Southern California 

Raveling has been Nike's global basketball sports marketing director since he retired from coaching in 1994.   FOX Sports Net color commentator, he is a member of the Naismith Memorial Basketball Hall of Fame.

Early life
Born and raised in Washington, D.C., Raveling did not play basketball until his ninth grade year.  He was enrolled at St. Michael's, a Catholic boarding school in Hoban Heights, Pennsylvania; it was founded as an orphanage in 1916 near Scranton and closed in 2010. His grandmother's employer helped him enroll. Raveling's father died when he was 9 and his mother was institutionalized when he was 13, so academics became among the most influential forces in his life.

College and early career
Raveling attended college at Villanova University near Philadelphia and played basketball for the Wildcats. An outstanding rebounder, he set school single game and season rebounding records in his time. Raveling was team captain in his senior season, featured on the cover of the 1960 media guide, and led the Wildcats to consecutive appearances in the National Invitation Tournament (NIT) in 1959 and 1960. The Philadelphia Warriors selected him in the eighth round (pick 7) of the 1960 NBA draft.

Raveling became an assistant coach at his alma mater Villanova, then moved to Maryland in 1969 on the staff of new head coach Lefty Driesell.  he became the first African American coach in the Atlantic Coast Conference

March on Washington with Martin Luther King Jr., 1963
On August 28, 1963, as Martin Luther King Jr. waved goodbye to an audience of over 250,000 "March on Washington" participants, Raveling asked King if he could have the speech. King handed Raveling the original typewritten "I Have a Dream" pages. Raveling was on the podium with King at that moment, having volunteered to provide security. He kept the original, and had been offered more than three million dollars for the speech in 2013. 
He declined the offer. In 2021, he gave it to Villanova University. It is intended to be used in a "long-term "on loan" arrangement."

Head coaching career

Washington State (1972–1983)
Hired in Pullman in  Raveling was the first African-American basketball coach in the Pacific-8 Conference (Pac-8, now Pac-12). The first was in 1980 and marked the first time WSU was included in the NCAA bracket since the runner-up finish in 1941; the second was three years later in 1983. Raveling was one of the winningest coaches in Washington State basketball history, with a  record and seven winning seasons, including five straight from the 1975–76 campaign through the 1980 season.

While at WSU, Raveling was  the West Regional coach at the 1979 U.S. Olympic Sports Festival, and an assistant coach for the U.S. Olympic Trials in 1980.

Among his outstanding players were James Donaldson, Craig Ehlo, Don Collins, Bryan Rison, and Steve Harriel, who all earned All-Pac-10 first team honors. Donaldson went on to play in the NBA for 14 years and was on the Western Conference team for the All-Star Game in 1988.  Collins played in both the NBA and CBA after setting the WSU record for career steals and finishing third in scoring. Ehlo, a junior college transfer from Texas, was selected in the third round of the 1983 NBA draft by the Houston Rockets; he played fourteen seasons with four NBA teams, amassing respectable career totals of 7,492 points, 2,456 assists, and 3,139 rebounds.

Raveling was the UPI Pac-8 Coach of the Year winner in 1976, its coach of the year twice (1976 (shared), 1983), and was the national runner-up for AP coach of the year  He was honored by WSU with his induction into the Pac-12 Hall of Honor.

Iowa (1983–1986)
Raveling succeeded Lute Olson as head coach at the University of Iowa in April 1983, and guided the Hawkeyes to consecutive 20-win seasons and NCAA tournament berths in 1985 and 1986.

1984 Olympics, assistant coach

At the Olympics in 1984 in Los Angeles, he served as the assistant coach for the USA team, composed of collegians. Bob Knight was the head coach, and Steve Alford and Michael Jordan were guards on that team. Shooting 63.9 percent from the floor, the U.S. team captured the ninth Olympic title with a convincing 96–65 victory over Spain in the gold medal game.

During his three years at Iowa, Raveling is probably best known for his recruits and outstanding players, including B. J. Armstrong, Kevin Gamble, Ed Horton, Roy Marble, and Greg Stokes, all of whom went on to play in the NBA.

USC (1986–1994)
In March 1986, he returned to the Pac-10 as head coach for the University of Southern California (USC) in Los Angeles.

Hank Gathers and Bo Kimble were recruited to USC by Head Coach Stan Morrison and his top assistant, David Spencer. They were joined by high school All-American, Tom Lewis, and Rich Grande as the "Four Freshmen" star recruiting class. Following an 11–17 season coaching USC, Morrison and Spencer were fired after the 1985–86 season was over, despite winning the Pac-10 the previous year. It was reported that the players would not remain unless certain conditions were met, including having a say in the next coaching staff. USC hired Raveling as the next head coach of the Trojans. Raveling gave the players a deadline to respond whether they would remain on the team. When they did not respond, he revoked the scholarships of Gathers, Kimble, and Lewis. Raveling's controversial statement was, "You can't let the Indians run the reservation," he said. "You've got to be strong, too. Sometimes you have to tell them that they have to exit." Kimble and Gathers transferred together from USC to Loyola Marymount. Lewis transferred to Pepperdine. Grande remained at USC.

During Raveling's career at USC, the Trojans advanced to the NCAA tournament in 1991 and 1992 and competed in the NIT in 1993 and 1994.

Raveling was named Kodak National Coach of the Year (1992), Basketball Weekly Coach of the Year (1992), Black Coaches Association Coach of the Year (1992) and CBS/Chevrolet National Coach of the Year (1994).

Raveling and Sonny Vaccaro had been close friends, to the point that he was the best man at Sonny's second wedding. But, Raveling had a falling out with Sonny over the business of summer high school basketball camps that Sonny ran.

Car accident and coaching retirement, 1994
On the morning of September 25, 1994, Raveling's Jeep was blindsided in a two-car collision in Los Angeles. He was seriously injured, suffering nine broken ribs, a fractured pelvis and clavicle, and a  He was in intensive care due to bleeding in his chest cavity for two weeks. Citing the automobile accident and planned lengthy rehabilitation, he retired as head coach of USC at the age of 57 on

Post-coaching
Raveling has worked as the Director for International Basketball for Nike since his retirement from USC, and has authored two books on rebounding drills, War on the Boards and A Rebounder's Workshop. He has served as a color commentator for CBS Sports and FOX Sports Net, often drawing assignments for Pac-10 conference games.

Raveling has the original typewritten "I Have a Dream" speech given to him by Martin Luther King Jr.

On September 8, 2018, he was selected by former University of Maryland head basketball coach Lefty Driesell as one of Driesell's presenters upon his induction into the Naismith Hall of Fame.

Awards
In 2013, he received the John W. Bunn Lifetime Achievement Award by the Naismith Memorial Basketball Hall of Fame.

On November 21, 2013, he was a recipient of the Lapchick award (in memory of Joe Lapchick St. John's Basketball Coach, together with Don Haskins and Theresa Grentz.

Raveling was inducted into the College Basketball Hall of Fame in 2013.

On February 14, 2015 it was announced that George Raveling would be inducted into the Naismith Memorial Basketball Hall of Fame when he selected for direct election by the Contributor Direct Election Committee.

Head coaching record

Bibliography

A Rebounder's Workshop: A Drill Manual on Rebounding
War on the Boards

References

External links
 
 

1937 births
Living people
African-American basketball coaches
American men's basketball players
Basketball coaches from Washington, D.C.
Basketball players from Washington, D.C.
College basketball announcers in the United States
College men's basketball head coaches in the United States
Iowa Hawkeyes men's basketball coaches
Maryland Terrapins men's basketball coaches
Naismith Memorial Basketball Hall of Fame inductees
National Collegiate Basketball Hall of Fame inductees
Philadelphia Warriors draft picks
USC Trojans men's basketball coaches
Villanova Wildcats men's basketball players
Washington State Cougars men's basketball coaches
21st-century African-American people
20th-century African-American sportspeople